The 1988 1000 km Fuji was the tenth round of the 1988 World Sports-Prototype Championship as well as the sixth and final round of the 1988 All Japan Sports Prototype Car Endurance Championship.  It took place at the Fuji Speedway, Japan on September 18, 1988.

Official results
Class winners in bold.  Cars failing to complete 75% of the winner's distance marked as Not Classified (NC).

Statistics
 Pole Position - #27 From-A Racing - 1:18.210
 Fastest Lap - #17 Omron Porsche AG - 1:21.795
 Average Speed - 183.106 km/h

References
 
 

F
6 Hours of Fuji
Fuji 1000